Älvdal can mean:

Älvdal Hundred, a district of Värmland in Sweden
Älvdalen Municipality, a municipality of Dalarna County in Sweden
Älvdalen Court District, a district of Dalarna in Sweden